William Allen Hadley (1860–1941) is the founder of the Hadley School for the Blind in Winnetka, Illinois

When you think of the other fellow only and not yourself, your own problem fades into insignificance; in unselfishness lies the real thrill of being alive. - William A. Hadley

The school was founded in 1920 by William A. Hadley, a Chicago high school teacher who lost his sight at age 55. To address the absence of educational opportunities for blind people, he began teaching braille by mail and established a school offering accessible, tuition-free classes for blind and visually impaired people. Hadley has been quoted as saying if he had to choose between having his sight back and the Hadley School, he would choose the school.

Timeline
1860 - William Allen Hadley is born in Mooresville, Indiana. He has a brother and two sisters. He loses his vision in one eye (date unknown).
1881 - Graduates from Earlham College with a Bachelor of Arts degree before going on to earn his master's degree from the University of Minnesota.
Date Unknown - Marries Jessie Henderson, a schoolteacher from Fox Lake, Illinois.
Prior to 1900 - Taught at Marietta College in Ohio and in public schools in Peoria, Illinois
Date Unknown - Margaret and Emily Hadley are born to William and Jessie Hadley.
1900 - Begins teaching at Chicago's Lake View High School.
1905 - The Hadleys move to Winnetka, Illinois.
1915 - During the holiday break William Hadley catches influenza and two days later has permanently lost his sight from a detached retina.
1920 - Hadley and Dr. E.V.L. Brown, an ophthalmologist and friend, found the Hadley Correspondence School for the Blind.
November 1920 - A woman in Kansas becomes the first Hadley student to enroll to learn "braille by mail."
By 1938 - More than 1,000 home-study (distance education) courses have been sent to blind students throughout the U.S.
1941 - William Hadley dies and is buried in Mooresville, Indiana

Earlham College alumni
1941 deaths
1860 births
Blind academics
People from Mooresville, Indiana